The El Reno Railroaders was the final moniker of the minor league baseball teams based in El Reno, Oklahoma between 1904 and 1923. The El Reno minor league teams played as members of the Southwestern League in 1904, Oklahoma State League in 1908, Western Association in 1909 to 1910 and Oklahoma State League 1922 to 1923. El Reno teams hosted minor league home games at Adams Park.

History
Minor league baseball play began in El Reno, Oklahoma with the 1904 El Reno Indians who played briefly as members of the Southwestern League. On July 29, 1904, the Chickasha Indians franchise moved to El Reno and the franchise quickly folded after playing one game based in El Reno.

In 1908, the El Reno Indians became members of the Class D level Oklahoma State League. The Indians had a 4–5 record replacing the Hennessey Merry Widows, who had folded on May 19, 1908. The league began play on May 3, 1908, and folded on June 19, 1908.

El Reno gained a team in 1909 when the Joplin Miners relocated during the season to become the El Reno Packers. On July 4, 1909, Joplin moved to El Reno with a record 20-43 playing in the Class C level Western Association. The Joplin/El Reno team ended the 1909 season in last place with a record of 36–89. The team placed 8th under managers Thomas Hayden, Bailey Vinson and Jack McConnell, finishing 45.5 games behind the 1st place Enid Railroaders in the final standings.

In 1910, the El Reno Packers folded during the Western Association season. On July 31, 1910, with a record of 65–43, the El Reno Packers franchise folded. The 1910 player/manager was Art Riggs.

El Reno was without minor league baseball until the 1922 El Reno "Railroaders" rejoined the six–team, Class D level Oklahoma State League. The El Reno Railroaders of the Oklahoma State League ended the 1922 season with a record of 53–56. The Railroaders placed 4th in the final standings, finishing 16.0 games behind the Duncan Oilers as Virgil Moss served as manager.

The El Reno use of the "Railroaders" moniker corresponds to local industry. El Reno was home to the Rock Island Depot beginning in 1907. El Reno was also home to a Rock Island Railroad rail yard.

In their final season of play, the 1923 El Reno Railroaders placed 7th in the eight–team Oklahoma State League. The Railroaders ended the 1923 season with a record of 56–63 playing under manager Harry Burge. El Reno finished 12.0 games behind the 1st place Duncan Oilers in the final standings.

El Reno permanently folded following the 1923 season. El Reno, Oklahoma has not hosted another minor league team.

The ballpark
The El Reno minor league teams were noted to have played home minor league games at Adams Park. Today, Adams Park is still in use as a public park with four ballfields. The location is 2001 Park Drive, El Reno, Oklahoma.

Timeline

Year–by–year record

Notable alumni

Mike Balenti (1909)
Bert James (1910)
Wild Bill Luhrsen (1910)
Hank Robinson (1910)

See also
El Reno Packers players

References

Defunct Western Association teams
Defunct baseball teams in Oklahoma
Baseball teams established in 1922
Baseball teams disestablished in 1923
Canadian County, Oklahoma